Yulduz Turdiyeva is an Uzbek singer who sings in Uzbek, Azeri and Persian. She is an honored artist of Uzbekistan. Her music is characterized by her vocal improvisation.

Life
Yulduz Turdiyeva was born on August 10, 1985 in Bukhara region. In 2008, he graduated from the Uzbekistan State Conservatory. Married in 2007 and now has two children. The first music album of the singer, who won the 2010 "Nihol" award, was released in 2011. In addition, in 2004, she won the "Best Vocalist" award at the "Fifth International Youth Festival" held in Yalta, and the first prize at the International Mugam Festival held in Azerbaijan in 2009. Honored Artist of Uzbekistan.

Career
In 2009, she won first place at International World of Mugham Festival after performing Karabakh Shikastasi, fret of Azerbaijani mugham.

Discography 
 Ona men keldim degin
 Yulduz Turdiyeva and Otabek Yusupov — Rashkim yomon
 Shamol
 Kelma
 Libli Umriya
 Dilbaram Dilbar
 Muhabbat 
 Oʻzgancha tanovar
 Ishq Ayladi
 Nahori Nashta
 Fargʻona tong otguncha
 Chaman
 Bogʻimbor
 Kelgin Bahorim
 Yomgʻir
 Qoshlariqaro
 Istayiram Guramsani
 Qoʻymaslar
 Naylayin
 Bolajonlar
 Qaydabor
 Taramgʻi
 Yolgʻizimsan
 Shukrona
 Navoderlar
 Ketaveryorim
 Vatan
 Dardu dilingman

References

External links
Yulduz Turdiyeva Spotify

Uzbeks
Living people
21st-century Uzbekistani women singers
People from Bukhara
Mugham singers
1985 births